Scorpion Mountain is the fifth instalment in the Brotherband novel series by Australian author John Flanagan. It was released on 3 November 2014 in Australia. There is an attempt on Princess Cassandra's life and King Duncan calls for the Heron Brotherband (who are serving as the duty ship to Araluen) to help track down the mysterious plotters thought to be the Scorpion Cult.

Overview 
Hal, his Brotherband crew, and the Ranger Gilan have freed the twelve Araluens sold into slavery. After reaching the Royal Palace, the group is given a mission none of them expect. Princess Cassandra has recently survived an assassination. Now whispers of a second attempt have reached the kingdom, and the deadly sect known as the Scorpion Cult is believed to be the culprit. An assassin who tries to take Cassandra's life gives up vital information on the cult during interrogation.

They bring along the Ranger Gilan to help negotiate with the cult and ensure Cassandra's safety. While sailing they meet an old friend of Gilan's, the  Selethen. He tells the crew that Iqbal has taken over a city called Tabork along with a Hellenese man Philip Bloodyhand. Using a surprise takeover of an attack vessel of Philip's, the Herons takeover the city after a bloody fight. They mortally wound Iqbal but find out the  cannot be removed without the death of the Shurmel, the leader of the Scorpion cult. Ulf gets injured and has to stay in the port as the crew moves on to confront the cult.

They sail to the old Toscan colony of Ephesa so Hal and Gilan can go inland to Scorpion Mountain, the headquarters of the cult. There they go inland and find the remnants of an old Roman-style city. Hal notices the constant wind and makes a land-sailer to travel across the desert without a horse. The remaining crew stays to defend against the Ishti, a group of fighters owned by the Scorpion cult. Gilan is upfront and tries to get it removed. The Shurmel is offended and challenges Gilan to a sword fight where the Shurmel is defeated and killed. The trio moves to go back and meets Umar, a leader of the Bedullins who helped to free Erak in Erak's Ransom. He wants to defeat the Scorpion cults and helps defeat the Ishti who were attacking the remaining Heron crew. The Heron crew leave after the battle to Araluen where they are relieved from duty to the kingdom. They sail back to Hallasholm where they meet a feast and are welcomed back into their country.

External links 
 Scorpion Mountain at Random House Australia
 Scorpion Mountain at Random House New Zealand
 Scorpion Mountain at Penguin Group (USA)

2014 Australian novels
Australian fantasy novels
Brotherband books
Random House books
Philomel Books books